Tripician is a surname. Notable people with the surname include:

Joe Tripician (born 1953), American film producer, writer, screenwriter, film director, songwriter and playwright
Nicholas Tripician (born 1978), American rower
Wendy Tripician (born 1974), American rower